Flip Grater (born 1981) is the stage name of singer-songwriter, author, activist and chef Clare Grater, born in Christchurch, New Zealand. Flip Grater started Maiden Records, an independent NZ record label, which has released her own work as well as albums from Urbantramper and Marlon William's first band The Unfaithful Ways.

Flip Grater has released two EPs, four critically acclaimed albums and written two books. She has worked as a music judge for Smokefreerockquest, a music mentor and taught songwriting workshops across New Zealand as well as being involved in charity work with animal rights organization SAFE and organising fundraising events to save historical buildings.

She has also worked in radio, having hosted shows for several years for RDU98.5fm and in the film industry as a film producer and production manager for Gorilla Pictures, working on several music videos and 2 feature films. Flip Grater regularly tours in Germany, France, UK, Portugal and Italy and is signed to indie labels Make My Day in Germany and Vicious Circle in France. 

She currently resides in Christchurch NZ with her husband Youssef Iskrane, a French/Moroccan bartender she met while living in Paris recording Pigalle, and their daughter Anaïs. Anaïs was the inspiration for Grater's latest release, a collection of French and English lullabies Lullabies For Anaïs to whom the EP was dedicated. 
In 2018 Flip started school lunch delivery business Yumbo and vegan butchery and delicatessen Grater Goods' which Youssef and Flip continue to run, along with a French-style wine cave called Pinot Cave.

Discography
 Lullabies For Anaïs EP, (December 2018)
 Pigalle LP, (2 April 2014)
 While I'm Awake I'm at War LP, (12 July 2010)
 Be All And End All LP, (1 July 2008)
 Cage for a Song LP, (1 August 2006)
 Nameless EP (2004)

Bibliography
 "The Cookbook Tour" (2007)
 "The Cookbook Tour Europe " (2011) was published by Bateman Publishing in May 2011

References

External links
Instagram
Facebook
Twitter
Grater Goods

1981 births
Living people
People from Christchurch
New Zealand women singer-songwriters
New Zealand food writers
New Zealand record producers
Talk radio hosts
21st-century New Zealand  women singers
Women record producers
New Zealand radio presenters
New Zealand women radio presenters